Latif Nassif Jassim (1941 – 30 August 2021) was an Iraqi politician and leader of the Arab Socialist Ba'ath Party.

Biography
Latif Nassif Jassim was born in 1941 and belonged to the Dulaim tribe. He joined the Ba'ath party in 1957 and was arrested after the 18 November 1963 movement.

He held ministerial positions from 1977 until 1996. He was appointed minister of agriculture and agrarian reform on 5 April 1977, minister of culture and media until 1991 and minister of labor and social affairs until 1996.

His name was included in the list of Iraqis wanted by the United States at number 18, and he was 10 of Clubs on the most wanted Iraqis playing cards.

Latif was arrested on 9 June 2003 and sentenced to life imprisonment in 2009 in the case of the murder of Mohammad al-Sadr.

References

External links
LATIF NUSAYYIF JASIM AL-DULAYMI | United Nations Security Council

1941 births
2021 deaths
Politicians from Baghdad
Members of the Regional Command of the Arab Socialist Ba'ath Party – Iraq Region
Most-wanted Iraqi playing cards
Iraq War prisoners of war
Iraqi prisoners of war
Iraqi people who died in prison custody